The New Karuma Bridge, also referred to as the Second Karuma Bridge, is a proposed bridge in Uganda. It will replace the current Karuma Bridge, which was built in 1963.

Location
The bridge would be located at Karuma Falls, across the Victoria Nile, immediately west and downstream of the old Karuma Bridge. The coordinates of the New Karuma Bridge are 02°14'35.0"N, 32°14'22.0"E (Latitude:2.243056; Longitude:32.239444).

History
The current Karuma Bridge (the old bridge) was constructed in 1963, one year after Uganda attained independence from Britain. The old bridge is a narrow, one carriageway (one lane in each direction), without pedestrian or bicycle lanes and no monitoring equipment. The bridge has been the site of several major accidents.

The proposed new bridge would be modeled after the New Jinja Bridge in the Eastern Region of Uganda. A suspended cable bridge, with bicycle/motorcycle lanes is being considered. The feasibility studies and technical designs for the new bridge have been concluded. The Japan International Cooperation Agency (JICA) has indicated interest in the project, although it has not confirmed willingness to fund it.

Construction
Construction commencement is contingent on securing a government down-payment and development partner counter-funding. As of October 2020, according to the New Vision newspaper, the government of Japan, through JICA, was evaluating the possibility of funding the construction of the New Karuma Bridge.

Construction costs
In 2017, NBS Television reported that the estimated cost of the new bridge was in excess of US$100 million.

See also
List of roads in Uganda

Photos
Photo of Old Karuma Bridge

References

External links
Government plans to build new city at Karuma As of 31 March 2013.

Bridges over the Nile
Bridges in Uganda
Proposed bridges in Africa
Oyam District
Kiryandongo District
Cable-stayed bridges
Proposed transport infrastructure